AM-2389 is a classical cannabinoid derivative which acts as a potent and reasonably selective agonist for the CB1 receptor, with a Ki of 0.16 nM, and 26x selectivity over the related CB2 receptor. It has high potency in animal tests of cannabinoid activity, and a medium duration of action. Replacing the 1',1'-dimethyl substitution of the dimethylheptyl side chain of classical cannabinoids with cyclopropyl or cyclopentyl results in higher potency than cyclobutyl, but only the cyclobutyl derivatives show selectivity for CB1 over CB2. High selectivity for CB1 over CB2 is difficult to achieve (cf. AM-906, AM-1235), as almost all commonly used CB1 agonists have similar or greater affinity for CB2 than CB1, and the only truly highly selective CB1 agonists known as of 2012 are eicosanoid derivatives such as O-1812.

See also 
 HHC
 AMG-36
 AMG-41

References 

AM cannabinoids
Benzochromenes
Cyclobutanes